Angami may refer to:
 Angami Naga, one of the Naga peoples of northeastern India
 Angami language